Xie Cheng (182-254), courtesy name Weiping. An in-law to the warlord then Emperor of Eastern Wu Sun Quan, he served in Jing province after Sun Quan's conquests there and was a noted historian whose work is still used.

Life 

From Shanyin County (山陰縣), Kuaiji Commandery, which is in present-day Shaoxing, Zhejiang. It would take more than a decade after the death of his sister Lady Xie to be appointed at court, when he was made a Gentleman for All Purposes (五官郎中) around 210. After the Sun-Liu territorial dispute in Jing was settled in 215, Xie Cheng was promoted to the positions of Commandant of East Changsha (長沙東部都尉) then after Lü Meng's 219 conquest of Jing, became the Administrator (太守) of Wuling Commandery (武陵郡). Xie Cheng was known for being very well read and for his excellent memory and became a historian, his work including a notable example of the trend in the era for regional histories with his Kuaiji xianxian zhuan (會稽先賢傳 Biographies of the Former Worthies of Kuaiji). As part of Wu's claim to being successor of the Han and perhaps drawing on the material collected by his father, he also wrote over 100 volumes of the Hou Han Shu (後漢書), which documented the history of the Eastern Han dynasty, though only fragments survive it is considered by Rafe de Crespigny as an important source on the Later Han.

Family 

Cheng's father, Xie Jiong (謝煚) sometimes called Xie Ying (謝嬰) served as a Gentleman of Writing (尚書郎) and the Prefect (令) of Xu County (徐縣) in the Eastern Han dynasty. Xie Jiong was known for his good moral conduct and brilliance since he was young. The material he collected from the imperial archives when serving at the Secretariat in the Han capital may have been used by Cheng for his history on the Han. Cheng's uncle Xie Zhen (謝貞), was known for being very law-abiding, studious, and morally upright in conduct. He was nominated as a xiaolian (civil service candidate) and later served as the Chief (長) of Jianchang County (建昌縣). He died in office.

Xie Cheng's older sister Lady Xie became wife of Sun Quan, the future founding Emperor of Eastern Wu and was initially greatly favoured but when he wished to have a new wife as her superior, she refused and she died young. Despite her death, her family would continue to serve the Sun regime.

Cheng's eldest son Xie Chong (謝崇), served as General Who Spreads Might (揚威將軍) and his youngest son, Xie Xu (謝勗), served as the Administrator (太守) of Wu Commandery with both gaining renown.

See also 
 Lists of people of the Three Kingdoms

Notes

References 

 Chen, Shou (3rd century). Records of the Three Kingdoms (Sanguozhi).
 Pei, Songzhi (5th century). Annotations to Records of the Three Kingdoms (Sanguozhi zhu).

182 births
254 deaths
People of Eastern Wu
Ancient Chinese historians
Eastern Wu historians